August Faller GmbH & Co. KG is a German manufacturer and system supplier of pharmaceutical secondary packaging headquartered in Waldkirch, in Baden-Württemberg. With 1147 employees in 6 different locations across Europe, the company produces 2.1 billion folding cartons, 1.6 billion leaflets and 1 billion adhesive labels per year. August Faller GmbH & CO. KG is one of the market leading companies in the field of pharmaceutical secondary packaging in the German-Speaking region.

History

The company was founded in 1882 by August Faller as a lithographic printing business. Initially, it produced letterheads, postcards and business documents. In 1932, the company began to specialise in label production. In 1953, the company completed a reorganisation. It began manufacturing folding cartons as another line of production besides labels. In 1992, the company began to specialise in pharmaceutical secondary packaging.
In 2001 and 2002, the company added production sites in Binzen and Schopfheim. In 2008, the PharmaServiceCentre (PSC) for packaging services in Großbeeren near Berlin was opened. In 2012, Faller acquired Danish folding carton manufacturer A.C. Schmidt A/S in Hvidovre, Denmark. In autumn 2013, the company opened a new production plant in Łódź, Poland. The subsidiary Digital Packaging Service GmbH was founded in 2017 and has been renamed into PackEx GmbH in January 2019. With an open approach in the industry, PackEx GmbH produces folding boxes in small batches from 1 to 5,000 pieces with fully digitalized and high resource-saving processes.

Locations
Folding cartons and combination products are manufactured in accordance with cGMP requirements in Waldkirch, which is also the location of the company’s headquarters. Leaflets are produced in Binzen. Labels are manufactured in Schopfheim, using flexo and digital printing methods. The manufacturing facility in Großbeeren produces leaflets and provides packaging services. This site also has the manufacturing authorisation pursuant to Article 13 of German ‘Medical Preparations Act’. This states that secondary packaging is an integral part of a medical preparation. The company’s subsidiary, August Faller A/S, manufactures folding cartons in Hvidovre, near the Danish capital of Copenhagen. In autumn 2013, the company opened another production facility, August Faller Sp. z o.o., for folding cartons in Łódź, Poland.

Products
The company produces folding cartons, adhesive labels, leaflets and combination products for the pharmaceutical industry. This includes special design for bottles or blister packaging. Moreover, anti-counterfeiting features can be integrated into folding cartons and adhesive labels. The company also provides packaging services.

Awards

Product awards
1997: First prize in the "pharmaceutical and medical products" category at the first European Folding Carton Award Competition in Istanbul
 2005: Pro Carton / ECMA Carton Award
 2006: Pro Carton / ECMA Carton Award
 2007: Pro Carton / ECMA Carton Award
 2008: Werkbund Label
 2009: Silver Pack for age-appropriate packaging  Finat "highly commended" certificate - "Pharmaceutical" category
 2010: Finat "highly commended" certificate - "Digital Imaging" category
 2011: Pro Carton ECMA Carton Award finalist for 2 folding carton designs
 2012: Finat award - "Digital Imaging" category Finalist in the Print and Media Award - "Innovation" category
 2013: Finat Award - "Booklet" category ”Finat "highly commended" certificate - "Security" categoryFinat "highly commended" certificate - "Self-promotional labels" categoryHP Indigo Showcase Award - "Security, Digital Imaging"Finalist Print Stars - "Digital Printing" category
 2014: Silver PrintStars 2014 for the "Multipage-Booklet-Label" in the category "Labels"  German Packaging Award for the "Hanger Info Label" in the category "labels, seals and other packaging aids"
2015: Silver Pack Award for the "Ergo Label"
2016: Deutscher Verpackungspreis for "Faller Pharma Compliance Pack", World Star Award for "Hanger Info Label"
2017: World Star Award for "Faller Pharma Compliance Pack" , Pharmapack Awards 2017 for "Faller Pharma Compliance Pack", Finalist European Excellence Award (ECMA) for "Elisa Kit Box"
2018: German Design Award of German Design Council for "Faller Pharma Compliance Pack"

Company awards
 1998: Environmental Award of the Federal State of Baden-Württemberg
 2007: Abbott Supplier Excellence Award
 2008: Abbott Supplier Excellence Award
 2009: Abbott Supplier Excellence Award
 2010: Abbott Supplier Excellence Award

Sustainability
100% of the energy used in the German production plants is from renewable sources. August Faller GmbH & CO. KG is certified in accordance with the environmental standard DIN EN ISO 14001, the location Großbeeren as well with Good Manufacturing Practice (GMP). 
By request, the company uses FSC certified materials in the manufacturing of its products. A defined percentage of the wood used in FSC products stems from sustainably managed forests and controlled sources.
Since 2012, the company has produced folding cartons using an alcohol-free printing process. Moreover, the fresh water requirement in printing plate production was reduced by 35%.
For the Binzen location, a building complex was designed in accordance with cybernetic criteria, which links ecologically functional components with representative elements. Since 2002, the company has been publishing an annual sustainability report.
In the regions where its productions sites are located, the company supports club activities, learning partnerships and environmental campaigns. With nine apprenticeship and two co-operative study programmes (Duale Hochschule), August Faller GmbH & CO. KG offers education across several locations. The apprentices are encouraged to work independently by organising their own social projects.

Memberships
 Fachverband Faltschachtel-Industrie e.V. (FFI / German Federation of Folding Carton Manufacturers)
 Wirtschaftsverband Industrieller Unternehmen (WVIB / Business Association of Industrial Enterprises)
 Verband Papier, Druck und Medien (VPDM / Association of Paper, Print and Media)
 European Carton Makers Association (ECMA)
 Bundesverband Mitarbeiterbeteiligung (AGP / Federal Association of Employee Participation)
 Sustainability Business Initiative in Baden-Württemberg
 Industrie und Handelskammer (IHK / German Chamber of Industry and Commerce)
 Effizienz Werkstatt (Efficiency workshop)

Literature
 Florian Langenscheidt,  Peter May (ed.): "Lexikon der deutschen Familienunternehmen" (Encyclopaedia of German family businesses), p 79-83, 2nd edition, Cologne 2014
 Lörrach district (ed.): "Landkreis Lörrach. Ganz persönlich" (Lörrach district. Up close and personal), p 90-91, Coesfeld 2012

References

External links
 Official website
 Badische-zeitung.de
 Badische-zeitung.de
 Ecv.de

German brands
Manufacturing companies of Germany
Companies established in 1882